Barnesdale is an unincorporated community and census-designated place (CDP) in Tillamook County, Oregon, United States. It was first listed as a CDP prior to the 2020 census.

The CDP is in northern Tillamook County, in the valley of Foley Creek, a north-flowing tributary of the Nehalem River. Miami-Foley Road is the main road through the community, leading north  to Oregon Route 53, from where it is a further  to Nehalem along U.S. Route 101.

Demographics

References 

Census-designated places in Tillamook County, Oregon
Census-designated places in Oregon